Somersal Herbert is a civil parish in the Derbyshire Dales district of Derbyshire, England.  The parish contains twelve listed buildings that are recorded in the National Heritage List for England. Of these, one is listed at Grade I, the highest of the three grades, one is at Grade II*, the middle grade, and the others are at Grade II, the lowest grade.  The parish contains the village of Somersal Herbert and the surrounding area.  The major building in the parish is Somersal Herbert Hall, which is listed, together with associated structures.  The other listed buildings are houses, a farmhouse, cottages and associated structures, a church and its lychgate, a churchyard cross and a telephone kiosk.


Key

Buildings

References

Citations

Sources

 

Lists of listed buildings in Derbyshire